Flavia Pennetta was the defending champion but withdrew due to a torn shoulder muscle.
Victoria Azarenka won in the final against Irina-Camelia Begu, 6–3, 6–2.

Seeds

Qualifying

Draw

Finals

Top half

Bottom half

External links
Main Draw

Singles